Federal is the debut studio album by American rapper E-40. It was released on November 10, 1993, on Sick Wid It Records. It peaked at number 80 on the Billboard Top R&B/Hip-Hop Albums. Jive Records reissued Federal in 1995 with an alternate tracklist and tracks 7, 11 and 13 missing.

Critical reception
Spin called Federal a "historic, self-released debut [that] invented a hustle, a sound, a new rap language."

Track listing 
 All tracks were produced by Studio Ton

Samples
"Extra Manish" contains a sample of "Left Me Lonely" by MC Shan.
"Drought Season" contains a sample of "One Love" by Whodini.
"Hide 'N Seek" contains a sample of "Flirt" by Cameo.
"Rat Heads" contains a sample of "No Name Bar" by Isaac Hayes and "Short Dog's in the House" by Too Short.

Charts

References

E-40 albums
1993 debut albums
Albums produced by Studio Ton
Jive Records albums
Self-released albums
Sick Wid It Records albums